Sri Vyasa NSS College, is a general degree college located in Vyasagiri, Wadakkancherry, Thrissur district, Kerala. It was established in the year 1967. The college is affiliated with the University of Calicut. This college offers different courses in arts, commerce and science.

Departments

Science
Physics
Chemistry
Mathematics
Botany
Zoology

Arts and Commerce
Malayalam
English
Hindi
History
Sanskrit
Economics
Commerce

Accreditation
The college is recognized by the University Grants Commission (UGC).

Notable alumni
 K. Radhakrishnan, Devaswom Minister, State of Kerala
 Rachana Narayanankutty, Actor
 V. M. Devadas, Writer
 Anil Akkara, Ex-Member Kerala Legislative Assembly

References

External links

Universities and colleges in Thrissur district
Educational institutions established in 1967
1967 establishments in Kerala
Arts and Science colleges in Kerala
Colleges affiliated with the University of Calicut